BEM - Bordeaux Management School (Now KEDGE Business School) is the legal name of a French Grande École founded in 1874, managed and financed by the Bordeaux Chamber of Commerce.
The Master of Science in Management programme is also known as "École Supérieure de Commerce de Bordeaux" or "ESC Bordeaux".

BEM is a member of the Chapitre de la Conference des Grandes Écoles, which is the association of France's leading schools.

BEM is based in Talence near Bordeaux. BEM is a member of the "campus d'excellence (IDEX)", "Université de Bordeaux", an élite research federation. In 2008, BEM opened new campuses in Dakar and Paris.

BEM Talents is the name of their alumni society.

BEM and Euromed have now merged as KEDGE, which is the third French business school in terms of budget and second for research.

 In 2021, Kedge was ranked 40th European business school by the Financial Times.

History 
 1873 : Foundation of École supérieure de commerce de Bordeaux
 2000 : Equis accreditation
 2001 : Wine MBA
 2004 : The school was chosen by ONU and EFMD for the "Globally Responsible Leadership Initiative" launch
 2007 : AMBA accreditation (Wine MBA)
 2007 : Bordeaux École de Management becomes BEM - Bordeaux Management School
 2008 : BEM Dakar Campus in Sénégal
 2008 : BEM Paris Campus
 2009 : AACSB Accreditation
 2013 : Merger with EUROMED Management School, Marseille to form KEDGE Business School

Accreditations 
 Member of the Chapitre de la conférence des Grandes Ecoles
 EQUIS (European Quality Improvement System) accredited
 Member of the Global Compact
 AMBA (Association of MBAs) accredited
 AACSB accredited
As an EQUIS + AMBA + AACSB school, BEM is a "Triple Crown"; only 12 schools have this triple accreditation in France, and 57 in the world (as on 1/1/2012).

Partnerships & Doubles-degrees

Business Partnerships
JP Morgan, Société Générale, Auchan, Pricewaterhousecoopers, Procter & Gamble, Ernst & Young, L'Oréal or BNP Parisbas.

Academic Partnerships
BEM is a member of the PRES Université de Bordeaux which gathers Sciences Po Bordeaux, the National Magistrates School (ENM), Institut Polytechnique de Bordeaux and most Bordeaux universities.

The Université de Bordeaux has been selected by the French government to become an IDEX campus, a "campus lauréat des initiatives d'excellence", which are going to be top-funded campuses in France. The aim of these "IDEX" is to compete with the best American universities.

BEM Grande Ecole students can complete a double-degree from either an international partner university or from Bordeaux's Bar School. They also have the possibility to be awarded the "DSCG", the main French accountancy diploma.

La plupart sont accréditées (EQUIS, AACSB et AMBA).

* International Relations

BEM Grande Ecole Students have to complete a 6-month international experience through an internship or study abroad.
They can study for a semester/year or a double-degree (MA, MSc or MBA) at a partner university, for instance at HEC Montréal, EBS Business School, Mannheim Business School, Stockholm School of Economics, Nottingham Business School, Laval, Hong Kong University and the highly prestigious Swiss university of Saint-Gallen.
Most of them are accredited (EQUIS, AACSB et AMBA) and are highly ranked institutions.

Research 

Former French Prime Minister Alain Juppé, who is the current Mayor of Bordeaux, has signed Bordeaux's Call for Responsible Management.

Student life
More than 30 clubs (sports, culture,...).
"AOC" is France's biggest student-run oenological club. It organises visits to the greatest vineyards (Château Rothschild, Château d'Yquem,... ), wine-tasting sessions and the "Wine Rally".

Evolution of KEDGE BUSINESS SCHOOL 
In the year 2013, BEM joined hands with EUROMED Management School to form KEDGE Business School as a Merger of Equals. The thus formed merger will have its central administration at BEM campus in Bordeaux.

Notable alumni 
Bordeaux Management School has an active network of 20,000 members. According to the number of notable alumni, it is the eighth most powerful network in France among French business schools.

References

External links
Official Website
BEM Leaflet
Official Video
New Website

Business schools in France